Pamela Chaudry Singh (born 1961), known for some years as Pamella Bordes, is an Indian photographer and former Miss India.

Personal life
Singh was born in New Delhi in 1961; her father, Major Mahinder Singh Kadian, was an officer in the Indian Army. She attended the Maharani Gayatri Devi Girls' Public School in Jaipur then transferred to the Lady Sri Ram College in Delhi to study literature. She won the Miss India crown in 1982 and represented India in the Miss Universe pageant the same year. She subsequently moved to Europe, where she met and married Henri Bordes.

Singh studied at Parsons School of Design in New York, the American University of Paris, and the International Center of Photography in New York. She took to photography as her career in 1997.

Allegations
In the late 1980s Singh worked in a brothel which had provided one of British publicist Max Clifford's clients with various services. Clifford asked the madam to reveal details of her girls and clients, and found that one prostitute, Pamella Bordes, was simultaneously dating Andrew Neil (then editor of The Sunday Times), Donald Trelford (then editor of The Observer), Conservative minister for sport Colin Moynihan, and billionaire arms dealer Adnan Khashoggi. Clifford rang News of the World editor Patsy Chapman and drip-fed her the story of Bordes through the investigative reporter she was using on the madam. The story was published in March 1989 under the headline "Call Girl Works in Commons", since it was discovered she had a House of Commons security pass arranged by MPs David Shaw and Henry Bellingham.

Clifford claimed Bordes was never his client, and that he earned his fee for "writing" the story, which ultimately served the purpose of saving the madam from any adverse publicity or court case.

References

External links
Feature from the Hindustan Times
https://www.indiatoday.in/magazine/special-report/story/19890415-pamella-bordes-sexual-escapades-with-high-and-mighty-rock-british-establishment-815974-1989-04-15

1961 births
20th-century Indian photographers
20th-century Indian women artists
21st-century Indian photographers
American University of Paris alumni
Photographers from Delhi
Femina Miss India winners
Indian emigrants to England
Indian photojournalists
Indian women photographers
Living people
Miss Universe 1982 contestants
Parsons School of Design alumni
Rajasthani people
Delhi University alumni
Women artists from Delhi
20th-century women photographers
21st-century women photographers
Women photojournalists